Red lodge may refer to:

 Red Lodge, Montana, United States
 Red Lodge Mountain Resort
 Red Lodge Airport
 Red Lodge, Norton, Runcorn, Cheshire, England
 Red Lodge, Suffolk, United Kingdom
 Red Lodge Museum, Bristol, United Kingdom
 Red Lodge Provincial Park, Alberta, Canada
 Red Lodge (United States), fraternity in the United States